107.7 Lite FM (DXVS 107.7 MHz) is an FM station owned and operated by PEC Broadcasting Corporation. Its studios and transmitter are located at Brgy. Maranding, Lala, Lanao del Norte.

References

External links
Lite FM FB Page

Radio stations established in 2000